S. M. Abdul Mannan (born 15 December 1951) is a Jatiya Party (Ershad) politician and a former Jatiya Sangsad member representing the Manikganj-2 constituency.

Early life 
Mannan was born on 15 December 1951. He has a bachelor's degree in civil engineering.

Career 
Mannan is a director of Global Insurance Limited, Premier Leasing Limited, Delta Medical Centre, Delta Spinners Limited, and Mercantile Bank Limited. He had served a term as the President of Gulshan Club. He is a member of the board of governors of the Bangladesh Enterprise Institute.

Mannan was elected to Parliament from Manikganj-2 as a candidate of Jatiya Party in 2008. He was elected vice-chairperson of Premier Leasing and Finance Limited on 28 June 2009 and Mizanur Rahman Shelley was elected chairperson. He was a member of the Parliamentary Standing Committee on Industries Ministry.

While campaigning for the general elections in 2018 from Manikganj-2 constituency Mannan's motorcade was attacked allegedly by Awami League activists. Momtaz Begum, the Awami League candidate won the election. He received only 558 votes and came third in the election.

References

Living people
1951 births
Jatiya Party politicians
9th Jatiya Sangsad members
Place of birth missing (living people)